Dadin may refer to:
 Dadin-e Olya
 Dadin-e Sofla
 Dadin Rural District
 The Tatar-born Russian dissident Ildar Dadin